Sergei Dmitriyevich Borodin (born 19 October 1988) is a Russian professional football player.

Club career
He made his Russian Football National League debut for FC Yenisey Krasnoyarsk on 23 July 2012 in a game against FC Petrotrest Saint Petersburg.

References

External links 
 

1988 births
Sportspeople from Omsk
Living people
Russian footballers
Russia youth international footballers
Association football goalkeepers
FC Tyumen players
FC Yenisey Krasnoyarsk players
FC Irtysh Omsk players
FC Sakhalin Yuzhno-Sakhalinsk players
PFC Krylia Sovetov Samara players
FC Nizhny Novgorod (2007) players
FC Tolyatti players